Siswa is a village in Krityanand Nagar block, Purnia district, Bihar, India. The population was 422 at the 2011 Indian census.

References

Villages in Purnia district